General Nelson may refer to:

Alexander Nelson (British Army officer) (1814–1893), British Army lieutenant general
Allison Nelson (1822–1862), Confederate States Army brigadier general
John Nelson (British Army officer) (1912–1993), British Army major general
Neil Nelson (fl. 1980s–2020s), U.S. Marine Corps major general
Nels H. Nelson (1903–1973), U.S. Marine Corps major general
Otto L. Nelson Jr. (1902–1985), U.S. Army major general
Patrick Henry Nelson (1824–1864), Confederate States Army militia major general
Roger Nelson (politician) (1759–1815), Society of the Cincinnati brigadier general
Thomas Nelson Jr. (1738–1789), Lower Virginia Militia brigadier general
William "Bull" Nelson (1824–1862), Union Army major general